The 4th Canadian Division is a formation of the Canadian Army. The division was first created as a formation of the Canadian Corps during the First World War. During the Second World War the division was reactivated as the 4th Canadian Infantry Division in 1941 and then converted to armour and redesignated as the 4th Canadian (Armoured) Division. Beginning in 1916 the division adopted a distinctive green-coloured formation patch as its insignia. In 2013 it was announced that Land Force Central Area would be redesignated 4th Canadian Division. It is currently responsible for Canadian Army operations in the Canadian province of Ontario and is headquartered at Denison Armoury in Toronto.

First World War
The 4th Canadian Division was formed in Britain in April 1916 from several existing units and others scheduled to arrive shortly thereafter. Under the command of Major-general David Watson, the Division embarked for France in August of that year where they served both in the Western Front in France and in Flanders until Armistice Day. The 4th Canadian Division was a part of the Canadian Corps in the Battle of Vimy Ridge, which attacked and defeated the Germans, driving them from the ridge. As a result, the Canadians became known as masters of offensive warfare and an elite fighting force.

In the Battle of Vimy Ridge in April 1917, the 4th Canadian Division was given the job of capturing Hill 145, the highest and most important feature of Vimy Ridge. However, when they attempted to capture the hill, they were hampered by fire from the "Pimple", which was the other prominent height at Vimy Ridge. To capture Hill 145, forces which were supposed to attack the Pimple were redeployed and captured Hill 145.

Infantry units
10th Canadian Brigade:
44th (Manitoba) Battalion Canadian Infantry. April 1916 – 11 November 1918. (Re-designated New Brunswick in August 1918);
46th (South Saskatchewan) Battalion Canadian Infantry. April 1916 – 11 November 1918;
47th (British Columbia) Battalion Canadian Infantry. April 1916 – 11 November 1918. (Re-designated West Ontario in February 1918);
50th (Calgary) Battalion Canadian Infantry. April 1916 – 11 November 1918.

11th Canadian Brigade:
54th (Kootenay) Battalion Canadian Infantry. April 1916 – 11 November 1918;
75th (Mississauga) Battalion Canadian Infantry. April 1916 – 11 November 1918;
87th (Canadian Grenadier Guards) Battalion Canadian Infantry. June 1916 – 11 November 1918 (transferred from 12th Canadian Brigade);
102nd (North British Columbia) Battalion Canadian Infantry. April 1916 – 11 November 1918.

12th Canadian Brigade:
38th (Ottawa) Battalion Canadian Infantry. June 1916 – 11 November 1918;
51st (Edmonton) Battalion Canadian Infantry. April 1916 – 13 November 1916 (Became the 51st Garrison Battalion);
72nd Battalion (Seaforth Highlanders of Canada), CEF. April 1916 – 11 November 1918;
73rd (Royal Highlanders) Battalion Canadian Infantry. April 1916 – 19 April 1917 (disbanded);
78th (Winnipeg Grenadier) Battalion Canadian Infantry. April 1916 – 11 November 1918;
85th (Nova Scotia Highlanders) Battalion Canadian Infantry. April 1917 – 11 November 1918;
87th (Canadian Grenadier) Battalion Canadian Infantry. April 1916 – June 1916. (transferred to 11th Canadian Brigade).

Pioneers:
67th (Western Scot) Pioneer Battalion Canadian Infantry. 1 September 1916 – 11 November 1918;

Battles and Engagements on the Western Front
1916:
Battle of Le Transloy – 1–17 October
Battle of the Ancre Heights – 17 October – 11 November, (capture of the Regina Trench)
Battle of the Ancre – 13–18 November

1917:
Battle of Vimy Ridge – 9–14 April
Affairs South of the Souchez River – 3–25 June
Capture of Avion – 26–29 June
Battle of Hill 70 – 15–25 August
Second Battle of Passchendaele – 26 October – 10 November

1918:
Battle of Amiens – 9–11 August
Actions round Damery – 15–17 August
Battle of Drocourt-Quéant – 2–3 September
Battle of the Canal du Nord 27 September – 1 October
Battle of Valenciennes 1–2 November 1–2, (capture of Mont Houy)
Passage of the Grande Honnelle – 5–7 November

Second World War

4th Canadian (Armoured) Division 
The 4th Canadian (Armoured) Division was created during World War II by the conversion of the 4th Canadian Infantry Division at the beginning of 1942 in Canada. The division proceeded overseas in 1942, with its two main convoys reaching the United Kingdom in August and October.

The division spent almost two years training in the United Kingdom before crossing to Normandy in July 1944. In the United Kingdom, it participated in war games together with the Polish 1st Armoured Division, and later fought in France, the Low Countries, and Germany; both divisions followed very close paths. The division participated in the later stages of the Battle of Normandy at the Falaise Pocket, the advance from Normandy and spent almost two months engaged at the Breskens Pocket as well as Operation Pheasant. It wintered in the Netherlands and took part in the final advance across northern Germany.

Formation 
1944–1945

 4th Canadian Armoured Brigade 
21st Armoured Regiment (The Governor General's Foot Guards)
22nd Armoured Regiment (The Canadian Grenadier Guards)
28th Armoured Regiment (The British Columbia Regiment (Duke of Connaught's Own))
The Lake Superior Regiment (Motor)

 10th Canadian Infantry Brigade
10th Independent Machine Gun Company (The New Brunswick Rangers)  
The Lincoln and Welland Regiment
The Algonquin Regiment
The Argyll and Sutherland Highlanders of Canada (Princess Louise's)
10 Canadian Infantry Brigade Ground Defence Platoon (Lorne Scots)

 Other units 
29th Armoured Reconnaissance Regiment (The South Alberta Regiment)
"D" Squadron, 25th Armoured Delivery Regiment (The Elgin Regiment), Canadian Armoured Corps
15th Field Regiment, RCA
23rd Field Regiment, RCA
5th Anti-tank Regiment, RCA
8th Light Anti-aircraft Regiment, RCA
4th Canadian Armoured Division Engineers
8th Field Squadron, RCE
9th Field Squadron, RCE
6th Field Park Squadron, RCE
4th Canadian Armoured Division Bridge Troop, RCE
No. 46 Light Aid Detachment, RCEME
4th Canadian Armoured Divisional Signals, R.C. Sigs
No. 4 Defence and Employment Platoon (Lorne Scots)
12 Light Field Ambulance, RCAMC
No. 8 Provost Company, Canadian Provost Corps

Commanding officers

David Vivian Currie VC
David Vivian Currie VC was awarded the Victoria Cross for his actions in command of a battle group of tanks from The South Alberta Regiment, artillery, and infantry of the Argyll and Sutherland Highlanders of Canada at St. Lambert-sur-Dives, during the final actions to close the Falaise Gap. This was the only Victoria Cross awarded to a Canadian soldier during the Normandy campaign (from 6 June 1944 to the end of August 1944), and the only VC ever awarded to a member of the Royal Canadian Armoured Corps.

The then 32-year-old Currie was a Major in The South Alberta Regiment. During the Battle of Falaise, Normandy, between 18–20 August 1944, Currie was in command of a small mixed force of tanks, self-propelled anti-tank guns and infantry which had been ordered to cut off one of the Germans' main escape routes.

After Currie led the attack on the village of St. Lambert-sur-Dives and consolidated a position halfway inside it, he repulsed repeated enemy attacks over the next day and a half. Despite heavy casualties, Major Currie's command destroyed seven enemy tanks, twelve 88 mm guns and 40 vehicles, which led to the deaths of 300 German soldiers, 500 wounded and 1,100 captured. The remnants of two German armies were denied an escape route.

Gallery

Land Force Central Area and 2013 reactivation
The LFCA was created on 1 September 1991, taking command of what was previously Central Militia Area and the Regular Force Army units and formations in Ontario from the northern Lakehead region to the border with Quebec.  At that point in time, the six subordinate militia districts were reorganized into four: Northern Ontario District, London District, Toronto District, and Ottawa District each one garrisoned by a brigade of militia troops and a small number of regular support staff. Later that decade, in 1997, the four reserve force districts were again reorganized into three brigade groups.

At the time of its creation in the early-1990s, it was housed on the grounds of the former base and subsequently moved ca 1993 to the Place Nouveau office tower at Yonge Street north of Finch Avenue; this was controversial as the offices of the area commander, Major-General Brian Vernon, were lavishly renovated, attracting political criticism and attention from the Auditor General of Canada.

In 2013, the LFCA was renamed the "4th Canadian Division". With this change of name, the formation was also granted the identifying patch and historical lineage of the division that fought in the two world wars.

Present day organization 

The division is headquartered in Toronto and covers the province of Ontario.

 4th Canadian Division, in Toronto
  2 Canadian Mechanized Brigade Group, at CFB Petawawa
  31 Canadian Brigade Group, in London (covering Southwestern Ontario)
  32 Canadian Brigade Group, in Toronto (covering the Golden Horseshoe and Central Ontario)
  33 Canadian Brigade Group, in Ottawa (covering Eastern Ontario and Northeastern Ontario)
 4th Canadian Division Head Quqrters, in Toronto
 4th Canadian Division Support Group, at CFB Petawawa
 2 Military Police Regiment, in Toronto
 2 Intelligence Company (Reserve), in Toronto
 3rd Canadian Ranger Patrol Group, at CFB Borden
 4th Canadian Division Training Centre, in Meaford
 Ceremonial Guard, in Ottawa
 Canadian Forces Base Kingston, Kingston

3rd Canadian Ranger Patrol Group

Abbreviations
 ASU: Area Support Unit
 CFB: Canadian Forces Base
 RCA: The Royal Regiment of Canadian Artillery
 RCAC: Royal Canadian Armoured Corps
 CFMS: Canadian Forces Medical Service

Commanders 
 Brigadier-General Peter Scott, CD – 2021 – present 
 Brigadier-General Conrad Mialkowski, MSM  2019-2021
 Brigadier-General Jocelyn Paul Canadian Forces Organization Orders, MSC, CD – 2018 – 2019
 Brigadier-General Stephen Cadden CD – 2016 – 2018
 Brigadier-General Lowell Thomas, CD – 2014 – 2016
 Brigadier-General Omer Lavoie – 2012 – 2014
 Brigadier-General Fred Lewis, MSM, CD – 2010 – 2012
 Brigadier-General Jean-Claude Collin, OMM, CD – 2008 – 2010
 Brigadier-General John Howard, MSM, CD – 2007 – 2008
 Brigadier-General Guy Thibault, CD – 2005 – 2007
 Brigadier-General Greg Young, CD – 2005
 Brigadier-General Marc Lessard, CD – 2003 – 2005
 Brigadier-General Andrew Leslie, OMM, MSM, CD – 2002 – 2003
 Brigadier-General Michel Gauthier, CD – 2000 – 2002
 Colonel Chris Corrigan, CD – 1999 – 2000
 Brigadier-General Walter Holmes, MBE, MSM, CD – 1998 – 99
 Major-General Bryan Stephenson, CD – 1995 – 1998
 Major-General Brian Vernon, CD – 1993 – 1995
 Major-General Lewis MacKenzie, CD – 1992 – 1993
 Major-General Nicholas Hall, CD – 1991 – 1993

See also
Razing of Friesoythe
Christopher Vokes

References

External links 
 Battle of Vimy Ridge, April 1917
Lieutenant Charles Pearson: The Lincoln and Welland Regiment's WWII Campaign

Divisions of Canada in World War I
Infantry divisions of Canada
Military units and formations established in 1916
Military units and formations disestablished in 1919
Military units and formations established in 1940
Military units and formations disestablished in 1946
Military units and formations established in 2013
2013 establishments in Canada
Canadian 4th Armoured Division
Canadian World War II divisions
Military units and formations of the British Empire in World War II